Mile 30 is a settlement that is situated  south of Rundu in the Kavango East region of Namibia, on the B8 national road. It contains a school, a chapel of the Evangelical Lutheran Church in Namibia (ELCIN), some shops and a clinic.

The people of this village mainly depend on subsistence farming. The soil in this area is very fertile. People in this area have started to develop a community conservancy aimed at protecting the wildlife.

The majority of the males in this area carve wood crafts, which they sell to tourists in Okahandja.

References

Populated places in Kavango East